Rollinia bahiensis is a species of plant in the Annonaceae family. It is endemic to Brazil.  It is threatened by habitat loss.

References
 

bahiensis
Endemic flora of Brazil
Flora of Bahia
Vulnerable flora of South America
Taxonomy articles created by Polbot
Taxobox binomials not recognized by IUCN